Ronald David Loustel (born March 7, 1962) is a Canadian retired professional ice hockey goaltender who played in one National Hockey League (NHL) game for the Winnipeg Jets during the 1980–81 NHL season. He has the stigma of having allowed more goals than any other goaltender who only appeared in one NHL game. He allowed 10 goals on 51 shots (41 saves, 80.4 SV%) in a 10–2 loss to the Vancouver Canucks in his sole career NHL game on March 27, 1981. He has also played for the Kelowna Buckaroos, Saskatoon Blades, Tulsa Oilers, Brandon Wheat Kings, and Fort Wayne Komets.

Playing career
General manager John Ferguson Sr., facing severe goaltending woes, called up Loustel from the Saskatoon Blades of the Western Hockey League (WHL), hoping he would be the solution. In his only NHL appearance against the Vancouver Canucks, while he made 41 saves, the Canucks got 51 shots on goal, giving him 10 goals against (GA). Since he never played another NHL game, he currently holds the record of having the most GA of any goalie who played only 1 NHL game.

Career statistics

Regular season and playoffs

See also
List of players who played only one game in the NHL

References

External links

1962 births
Living people
Brandon Wheat Kings players
Canadian expatriate ice hockey players in the United States
Canadian ice hockey goaltenders
Fort Wayne Komets players
Saskatoon Blades players
Ice hockey people from Winnipeg
Tulsa Oilers (1964–1984) players
Winnipeg Jets (1979–1996) draft picks
Winnipeg Jets (1979–1996) players